Awilda Sterling-Duprey is an artist, dancer, and choreographer, and an important figure in Puerto Rico's art scene.

Biography 
Awilda Sterling-Duprey was born in Barrio Obrero, Santurce, Puerto Rico.

She earned her bachelor's degree in Painting from Escuela de Artes Plásticas in 1971. She also attended the University of Puerto Rico, Río Piedras, School of Visual Arts, New York, Pratt Institute, Brooklyn, and is a doctoral student in history at the Center for Advanced Studies in Caribbean Studies, San Juan. She received an Experimental dance fellowship from the NEA in 1985, a Caribbean Cultural Contribution Award from the Puerto Rican Cultural Institute and Clemente Soto Vélez Cultural award in 2001 among many other awards and recognitions. She was a United States Artists Rolón Fellow in 2010.

She is a founding member of Pisotón, the first experimental dance collective in Puerto Rico, and was an artist in residence with Taller de Otra Cosa.

Her performance practice combines Afro-Caribbean dance, jazz, and modern experimental movement. Sterling-Duprey has created and performed experimental dance works throughout New York City, Europe, Latin America, and the Caribbean. She currently teaches at Escuela de Artes Plásticas in San Juan, Puerto Rico.

References 

Year of birth missing (living people)
Living people
People from Santurce, Puerto Rico
Puerto Rican artists
Puerto Rican dancers
American choreographers